Hernán Martín García Simón (born 11 January 1965 in Buenos Aires) is a former Argentine rugby union player and a current coach. He played as a centre.

García Simón played for Pueyrredón Rugby Club, in Mar Del Plata. He would be the team's captain.

He had 7 caps for Argentina, from 1990 to 1992, scoring 1 try, 4 points on aggregate. He was called for the 1991 Rugby World Cup, playing in three games and scoring the only try and points of his international career.

After ending his player career, he became a coach. He has been the coach of Pueyrredón Rugby Club.

References

External links

1965 births
Living people
Argentine rugby union coaches
Argentine rugby union players
Argentina international rugby union players
Rugby union centres
Rugby union players from Buenos Aires